Choi Man-Hee (born October 21, 1956) is a former South Korean football player and coach.

He was started his coaching career with Namgang High School since 1987. He managed many teams, In 2010, Gwangju FC was joined in the K-League and he was appointed 1st manager of Gwangju FC.

References

External links
 K-League Player Record 

South Korean footballers
Jeonbuk Hyundai Motors managers
Gwangju FC managers
1956 births
Living people
Chung-Ang University alumni
Association football midfielders
South Korean football managers
Sportspeople from Gwangju